Auf Wiedersehen Monty (German for "Goodbye Monty") is a computer game for the ZX Spectrum, Commodore 64, Amstrad CPC, MSX and Commodore 16. Released in 1987, it is the fourth game in the Monty Mole series. It was written by Peter Harrap and Shaun Hollingworth with music by Rob Hubbard and Ben Daglish.

Gameplay

The player controls Monty as he travels around Europe collecting money in order to buy a Greek island - Montos, where he can safely retire. Gameplay is in the style of a flick-screen platform game, similar to many such games of the 1980s such as Technician Ted and Jet Set Willy. Some screens (such as those representing the Eiffel Tower and the Pyrenees) bear some relation to their real-life counterparts but most are just typical platform game screens.

Auf Wiedersehen Monty contains many features and peculiarities for the player to discover. Examples include being suddenly attacked by a bull's head in Spain after collecting a red cape (presumably a reference to bullfighting), a car being dropped in one of two places on entering a screen representing Düsseldorf in West Germany, a chef's hat found in Sweden (a reference to the Swedish Chef of Muppets fame; also, the two rooms representing Sweden are subtitled Bjorn and Borg), and a record in Luxembourg that when collected makes Monty breakdance to the game's title music (this may be a reference to Radio Luxembourg).

It is possible to get to areas of the game more quickly by flying from an airport using air tickets which can be collected throughout the game. Some parts of the game can only be reached in this manner.

As well as money, there are other miscellaneous objects to collect in the game for points. This was important as the player needs a certain number of points to get to Montos. These are often particular to the country Monty is visiting (such as berets in France). Bottles of wine or a glass of beer in West Germany cause Monty to briefly become drunk and his control to become slightly erratic leading to a reversal of controls, repeated jumping or Monty climbing any ladders or drainpipes he encounters.

Trivia
The games screens are laid out geographically, the complete map of the game corresponds with a map of Europe.
The money that Monty collects are labeled "EC", the European Currency Unit, one decade before the euro was introduced.
The title was inspired by the then-popular television series, Auf Wiedersehen, Pet.
The game won the award for best platform game of the year according to the readers of Crash magazine.
The game was voted number 57 in the Your Sinclair Readers' Top 100 Games of All Time.

Sequels
Moley Christmas was released later in the same year. A further Monty Mole game, called Impossamole was released in 1990. It took a different form to the previous games being more of a "console-style" arcade game.

References

External links
Auf Wiedersehen Monty at MobyGames

1987 video games
Amstrad CPC games
Commodore 16 and Plus/4 games
Commodore 64 games
Gremlin Interactive games
Monty Mole
MSX games
Platform games
Video game sequels
Video games scored by Ben Daglish
Video games scored by Rob Hubbard
ZX Spectrum games
Video games developed in the United Kingdom